Skylanders: SuperChargers is a role-playing platform video game developed by Vicarious Visions and Beenox and published by Activision. It was released on September 20, 2015, for PlayStation 3, PlayStation 4, Wii U, Xbox 360, Xbox One,  and was released on October 18, 2015, for iOS. Skylanders: SuperChargers Racing was released as a standalone title for Wii and the Nintendo 3DS on the same date, and it features only the racing portion. The game is the fifth installment of the Skylanders series. It introduces vehicles for the first time in the series.

A sequel to SuperChargers, Skylanders: Imaginators, was released in October 2016.

Gameplay 
Similar to its predecessors, Skylanders: SuperChargers is a "toy-to-life" video game in which players can place toy figurines on the "Portal of Power", which allows players to play as the figurine-represented character in-game. The game introduces a redesigned "Portal of Power", in which the surface has become larger and wider so as to accommodate vehicles, which are of larger size than typical characters. Vehicles are one of the newly introduced features in SuperChargers. According to Activision, about 50% of the game must be completed through driving. Vehicles are divided into three classes, which include land vehicles, sea vehicles and sky vehicles. With the use of ground vehicles and water vehicles, players can race on land or dive underwater on several different tracks, while the sky vehicles feature an "autopilot system" which can guide players to their destination automatically. Players have the option to accelerate and decelerate the sky vehicles.

Each track is filled with obstacles, which players must evade, and each has its own alternate routes, which can help a player to reach the finish line faster. Players must defeat a boss before they reach the finish line and they must solve a puzzle before they proceed. Players can also collect parts for vehicles to upgrade them. A customization screen automatically opens up after the player collects a part. The player can also choose to purchase mods to upgrade the vehicle via an in-game currency called "Gearbits", which can be earned through completing missions and stages. Each character has their own matching vehicles, and once the player finds out the correct combination, the character will enter a "Supercharged" state, which grants the vehicle additional abilities. The 117 characters introduced in the series since Skylanders: Spyro's Adventure are still playable in SuperChargers, but the game only includes 20 new figurines, due to the inclusion of vehicles. Returning characters, such as Stealth Elf and Trigger Happy are re-imagined with new abilities and a new upgrade tree. Additionally, the Nintendo versions of the game exclusively feature special guest appearances by Donkey Kong and Bowser of the Mario franchise, whom have Skylanders toy figures that can double as Amiibo figures for other games.

The game can also be played cooperatively with another player. Only one vehicle can be used, with one player driving while the other one defends against threats.

The Skystones minigame returns in a deeper, more refined form. The traps collected in Skylanders: Trap Team directly play into this, adding a unique Skystone to play. As per previous iterations, a Starter Pack including a portal is available in shops, however, consumers are able to download the title at a cheaper price, and use their existing portal from Skylanders: Trap Team.

Synopsis

Characters 
Skylanders: SuperChargers introduces twenty matching pairs of vehicles and SuperChargers. There are numerous variant figures of Skylanders and vehicles. There are also trophies that allow the players to race as villains; these come in racing action packs. A Kaos trophy is included in the dark edition of the game's starter pack. The Wii, Wii U, and 3DS versions of the game contain Bowser and Donkey Kong as playable characters, which are now playable in the Wii U and Switch versions of the game's sequel: Skylanders: Imaginators.

Plot 
As the game opens, Kaos narrates his previously failed plans as he tells the Portal Master that he has captured Master Eon, Flynn, Cali, and Hugo. Now that Kaos has control of the portals, he tells the players that they are getting cut off from Skylands forever. Hugo manages to get through to the Portal Master stating that they must place a land vehicle on the portal so that they can get the Skylanders to Skylands. Once that is done, the Skylanders infiltrate a transport ship owned by Count Moneybone where they manage to free Hugo, Cali, and Flynn. Hugo tells them that there are other prisoners on the transport ship that need to be free too. Upon getting topside, Flynn, Cali, and Hugo see a contraption that is "eating the sky." Hugo's book glows as Master Eon's message states that he has been taken captive and that Kaos has used the Darkness to construct the Sky Eater. In order to combat it, a special team of Skylanders called the SuperChargers have been assembled to help combat the Sky Eater utilizing special rift engines that utilize the same technology as the portals.

At Motley Meadows, the Skylanders find that it is under attack by the Sky Eater and they must rescue the inhabitants. Back on the transport ship, they work together to take out Count Moneybone's fighter ships that are targeting the escape pods that he had activated. Upon gaining control of the lead ship and rescuing the prisoners, they fall back to Skylanders Academy. Kaos learns from Glumshanks that some of the Trolls have been complaining about the Darkness getting bigger from the skies that it eats. Count Moneybone tells Kaos the status on Master Eon's confinement. The Skylanders head to the Cloudscraper Mountains to seek out the Cloudbreather Dragon, who can track Master Eon to where he is being held with the scent of a sock Hugo kept. However, the forces of Kaos have seized the mountain and try to kidnap the Dragon. The Superchargers liberate the dragon just in time. The Cloudbreather Dragon tells them that Eon is currently trapped in the Land of The Undead. However, in order to get there, they must upgrade the Skylander's vehicles Rift Engines using the Thunderous Bolt from Cloud Kingdom. Upon arrival, it seems that the place has been overtaken by Kaos, courtesy of Lord Stratosfear. He will not allow the Skylanders to take the bolt, so they must defeat him first. The Skylanders take down the transport ships invading the kingdom and attack Lord Stratosfear's Storm Generator. Upon Lord Stratosfear's defeat, all of the vehicles are upgraded by the Thunderous Bolt to travel to the Land of The Undead.

The Superchargers make it to the outskirts of the Detention Center and learn about the Perspective gates, which shifts gravity according to the position of the gate. Fighting their way through the prison and freeing as many prisoners as possible, Count Moneybone is defeated and Eon is freed. Kaos then learns of the defeat, but before he can act, the Darkness becomes sentient and proceeds to lead Kaos in the direction he needs. Meanwhile, Master Eon tells the Superchargers that they need to defeat the threat of the Darkness by finding out how the Ancients defeated it the last time; however, the only records of this is in the Spell Punk Library, which only a Spell Punk can navigate. The Superchargers go to BattleBrawl Island in order to defeat SpellSlamzer, a Spell Punk. The Superchargers then head to the Spell Punk Library, where they learn that the Darkness was let into Skylands by "The Dark Rift Engine", a super powerful Rift Engine, and the Core of Light was developed as a weapon against the Darkness, but it was never completed. They decide to seek the author of a book, Pomfrey Le Fuzzbottom in hopes that he can tell them how to complete the Core of Light.

At the Sky Eater, Kaos is convinced by the Darkness to rule the universe, not just Skylands. Glumshanks tries to talk Kaos out of it, but the Darkness convinces Kaos to fire Glumshanks. Glumshanks, now jobless, leaves the Sky Eater and is taken to the Skylanders Academy. Buzz is suspicious of Glumshanks, but agrees to give him a trial basis. The Superchargers head to Gladfly Glades, where they meet a strange collector who promises to give them Fuzzbottom if they can reach him, while shrunk to microscopic size. The Superchargers get to Fuzzbottom, who tells them that the last part of the Core of Light is The Eye of the Ancients, which will turn it into a weapon against the Darkness. However, it is in possession of a Lobster Titan, and the only way to match the Titan's power is to use the Kolossal Kernel, which is in possession of their old enemy, Cap'n Cluck, who has also started a fast food chain called Cap'n Cluck's King Size Chicken. However, this is a front for a chicken army, led by Cluck, and financed by the money he gets from selling his chicken, which he is growing with the Kolossal Kernel. The Superchargers defeat Cluck and take the Kolossal Kernel, which Mags then pops into popcorn. The Superchargers then use the Kolossal Kernel to grow to titan size and defeat the Lobster Titan, gaining the Eye of the Ancients.

Mags then completes the Core of Light, but Kaos has been warned by the Darkness that the Core of Light has been completed, and attacks the Skylanders Academy, destroying the Core of Light for good. Glumshanks then sacrifices himself so that the Superchargers can escape. They escape, but they now have no weapon against the Darkness. Pandergast then announces the Ridepacolypse Demolition Derby, and the grand prize is Glumshanks who has survived. The Skylanders win the derby and get Glumshanks back. Back at the Academy, Glumshanks proposes that the Superchargers use the Dark Rift Engine to send the Darkness back where it came from. Eon tells them that the Vault of the Ancients is the most likely place that the Dark Rift Engine could be. The Superchargers, Flynn, Tessa and Glumshanks head to the vault, where they meet a flower-like Watch Wraith named Pluck, who gives the Superchargers the ability to attract and repel things (or "Push" and "Pull") inside the vault. The Superchargers recover the Dark Rift Engine.

Once the Superchargers return, they are attacked by Sky Pirates who kidnap Mags. The Superchargers get on the Flying Bandit Train and fight Captain BlubberBeard, who wants Mags to make their train be able to escape the collapsing Skylands. BlubberBeard is defeated and Mags finishes modifying the Dark Rift Engine to send the Darkness back to where it came from. Meanwhile, Kaos is confronted by his conscience in the form an imaginary Glumshanks, who is trying to stop him from destroying all of Skylands, as his dream of ruling it would be ruined if he destroyed it. He confronts the Darkness about this, but the Darkness threatens to take away his powers, so Kaos opens a Mega Rift to destroy all of Skylands.

The Superchargers, Flynn, Cali and Glumshanks then launch an all-out attack on the Sky Eater and make it to Kaos's throne room, where Kaos attacks the Superchargers with the full Power of the Darkness, but he still loses. The Darkness then freezes everyone except for Kaos. Kaos then gets fed up with the Darkness telling him what to do and activates the Dark Rift Engine, and escapes with the Superchargers and their allies. The credits then roll after that. Suddenly, the Darkness pulls the Rift back open and sucks in the credits. The Darkness then put the remains of the Sky Eater as armor and Eon tells the player that all of their training has led them to this epic final battle, with the Darkness pulling the Superchargers into a void. The Superchargers defeat the Darkness and go back to the Academy, where Kaos tells them that just because the Darkness is gone forever does not mean that evil is still out there and joins the Academy as "the Ultimate Evil Consultant of Ultimate Evil" until he can find out how to get his powers back. Cali asks Buzz if that's a real job, and Buzz says that this is the best way to keep an eye on Kaos for the moment. Flynn then says that they need to do something awesome, which Cali, Buzz, Tessa, Mags, and Hugo all try saying their own versions of "Boom", but Flynn doesn't like them, Flynn finally suggests they all do it together. Everyone then says their own versions of "Boom!". Eon then narrates the player out, until Kaos interrupts him, taking over the closing narration. The credits roll (for real this time), ending the game.

Development 
A new Skylanders video game was confirmed by publisher Activision on February 5, 2015. The inclusion of vehicles and the game's title was leaked on May 26, 2015, ahead of its official reveal on June 3, 2015.

Skylanders: SuperChargers Racing 
The racing elements of the full game were developed by Beenox. The Nintendo 3DS and Wii versions only feature this racing portion, because porting the full current-generation game was considered "a big challenge" and game director Maxime Montcalm said that "nobody could do it". The plot is about the Skylanders competing in a Grand Prix sponsored by Pandergast for the Snow Globe of Destiny which will grant the winner one wish. SuperChargers Racing is the final Skylanders installment to be released on the Wii and Nintendo 3DS.

Reception 

Skylanders: SuperChargers received "generally favorable" reviews according to review aggregator Metacritic. Despite its positive reception, Activision reported in February 2016 that the game did not meet sales expectations.

Awards

References

External links 
 Official website

2015 video games
Activision games
Beenox games
Cooperative video games
Dinosaurs in video games
IOS games
Multiplayer and single-player video games
Nintendo 3DS games
Platform games
PlayStation 3 games
PlayStation 4 games
Racing video games
Crossover role-playing video games
Science fantasy video games
SuperChargers
Vehicular combat games
Video games scored by Lorne Balfe
Wii games
Wii U games
Xbox 360 games
Xbox One games
Video games about size change
Toys-to-life games
Superhero video games
Vicarious Visions games
3D platform games
Video game sequels
Video games developed in the United States